An Oread is a type of nymph in Greek mythology.

Oread may also refer to:

 Oread (poem), a poem by Hilda Doolittle
 Oread Limestone, construction stone from Mount Oread
 Mount Oread, "The Hill" upon which the University of Kansas is located
 Lake Orestiada, a lake in Greece
 Orestiada, a city in Greece
 , a creature in Dungeons & Dragons
 Orestíada, the Spanish and Catalan name of a trilogy by Aeschylus